Neftegorsk is a town and the administrative center of Neftegorsky District in Samara Oblast, Russia, located  southeast of Samara, the administrative center of the oblast. Population:

History
It was founded in 1960 as an oil-extracting settlement. Urban-type settlement status was granted to it in 1966; town status was granted in 1989.

Administrative and municipal status
Within the framework of administrative divisions, Neftegorsk serves as the administrative center of Neftegorsky District, to which it is directly subordinated. As a municipal division, the town of Neftegorsk is incorporated within Neftegorsky Municipal District as Neftegorsk Urban Settlement.

References

Notes

Sources

External links
Mojgorod.ru. Entry on Neftegorsk 

Cities and towns in Samara Oblast
Cities and towns built in the Soviet Union
Populated places established in 1960